MacArthur "Mac" Foster (June 27, 1942 – July 19, 2010) was a 20th-century American heavyweight professional boxer.

He competed from 1966 to 1976, winning 30 of his 36 professional bouts, with all his victories achieved by knockout. He stopped heavyweight contenders Thad Spencer, Cleveland Williams, whom he defeated twice, and Zora Folley. Foster went the distance against Muhammad Ali in April 1972, losing by a 15-round unanimous decision.

Early life
Foster was born in Alexandria, Virginia, a son, and the third of eleven children, of a Mississippi sharecropping family. He spent his childhood years in Fresno, California, where his father found employment as a nurse. Foster picked grapes and cotton as a youth. Fresno State University offered him a track and field scholarship out of Washington High School, but he declined the opportunity, choosing instead to enlist with the United States Marines. Whilst serving with the Marines he won fourteen amateur boxing titles, and was deployed for two combat tours in the Vietnam War. After a discharge from the Marines with the rank of sergeant, Foster turned professional, becoming the third Fresno boxer of note (Young Corbett III was a world welterweight champion and Wayne Thornton rose through the rankings to become a number one heavyweight contender in 1970). He trained with Pat DiFuria at the Merced Street Gym.

Boxing career
Standing at 6 ft 2" in height and known as "Big Mac The Knife from Fresno", Foster made his professional debut in 1966, winning his first 24 fights by knockout, and was named The Rings Progress of the Year for 1969. Britain's Boxing Illustrated wrote, "He could certainly whack!"

Whilst being employed as a sparring partner for Sonny Liston, Foster was reputed to have knocked down the former world champion, causing Liston two days later to work Foster over during another sparring session before handlers could intervene between the two men to stop it.

Big fights 
In 1969 Foster knocked out contender Thad Spencer in the first round, and twice knocked out a past his prime Cleveland Williams.

By 1970 Foster was ranked as the world's number one heavyweight contender and seemed set for a title shot, but his 24–0 winning streak came to an end when as favourite he was stopped in six rounds by the more experienced Jerry Quarry in June 1970. After the Quarry fight, Foster knocked out ageing and by then unranked Zora Folley in one round.

Versus Muhammad  Ali 
In April 1972 Foster faced Muhammad Ali in Tokyo in a rare 15-round, non-title bout. Although he defied Ali's prediction of a fifth-round stoppage by lasting the distance, Foster lost a clear decision to the former champion, winning just two rounds, one round, and no rounds on the three judges' respective scorecards.  Foster had never been in a professional fight longer than eight rounds before facing Ali.

Last fights 
Foster followed up his loss to Ali with knockouts of journeymen Sam McGill and Charles Williams. He was then outpointed by Bob Stallings, Joe Bugner and Henry Clark in consecutive bouts.

Foster served as George Foreman's sparring partner for Foreman's world title bout with Ken Norton in 1974. He retired from boxing in 1976 after losing his fourth consecutive decision, this time to prospect Stan Ward. Foster's final record was 30–6, with all 30 of his wins coming by knockout.

Later life
After retiring, Foster volunteered his time as boxing coach for youth.

Death
Foster died at the age of 68 of MRSA on Monday, July 19, 2010. His body was buried at the San Joaquin Valley National Cemetery in Santa Nella, California.

Personal life
He married Yolanda, the marriage producing four children, Gregory, Joshua, Nathaniel and Nicole.

Professional boxing record

|-
|align="center" colspan=8|30 Wins (30 knockouts), 6 Losses (1 knockout, 5 decisions) 
|-
| align="center" style="border-style: none none solid solid; background: #e3e3e3"|Result
| align="center" style="border-style: none none solid solid; background: #e3e3e3"|Record
| align="center" style="border-style: none none solid solid; background: #e3e3e3"|Opponent
| align="center" style="border-style: none none solid solid; background: #e3e3e3"|Type
| align="center" style="border-style: none none solid solid; background: #e3e3e3"|Round
| align="center" style="border-style: none none solid solid; background: #e3e3e3"|Date
| align="center" style="border-style: none none solid solid; background: #e3e3e3"|Location
| align="center" style="border-style: none none solid solid; background: #e3e3e3"|Notes
|-align=center
|Loss
|30–6
|align=left| Stan Ward
|UD
|10
|February 26, 1976
|align=left| San Jose Civic Auditorium, San Jose, California
|align=left|
|-
|Loss
| 30–5
|align=left| Henry Clark
|UD
|10
|May 30, 1974
|align=left| Oakland–Alameda County Coliseum, Oakland, California
|align=left|
|-
|Loss
| 30–4
|align=left| Joe Bugner
|PTS
|10
|November 13, 1973
|align=left| Empire Pool, Wembley, London
|align=left|
|-
|Loss
| 30–3
|align=left| Bob Stallings
|SD
|10
|June 30, 1973
|align=left| Aragon Ballroom, Chicago, Illinois
|align=left|
|-
|Win
| 30–2
|align=left| Charles "Hercules" Williams
|KO
|10
|May 3, 1973
|align=left| Chicago, Illinois
|align=left|
|-
|Win
| 29–2
|align=left| Sam McGill
|TKO
|9
|April 11, 1973
|align=left| Aragon Ballroom, Chicago, Illinois
|align=left|
|-
|Loss
| 28–2
|align=left| Muhammad Ali
|UD
|15
|April 1, 1972
|align=left| Nihon Budokan, Tokyo
|align=left|
|-
|Win
| 28–1
|align=left| Giuseppe Ros
|KO
|8
|December 26, 1971
|align=left| Hallenstadion, Zurich
|align=left|
|-
|Win
| 27–1
|align=left| Billy Joiner
|KO
|5
|July 29, 1971
|align=left| Olympic Auditorium, Los Angeles, California
|align=left|
|-
|Win
| 26–1
|align=left| Mike Boswell
|TKO
|4
|March 25, 1971
|align=left| Olympic Auditorium, Los Angeles, California
|align=left|
|-
|Win
| 25–1
|align=left| Zora Folley
|KO
|1
|September 29, 1970
|align=left| Selland Arena, Fresno, California
|align=left|
|-
|Loss
| 24–1
|align=left| Jerry Quarry
|KO
|6
|June 17, 1970
|align=left| Madison Square Garden, New York City
|align=left|
|-
|Win
| 24–0
|align=left| Jack O'Halloran
|KO
|1
|April 9, 1970
|align=left| Olympic Auditorium, Los Angeles, California
|align=left|
|-
|Win
| 23–0
|align=left| Jimmy Rossette
|KO
|4
|March 24, 1970
|align=left| Selland Arena, Fresno, California
|align=left|
|-
|Win
| 22–0
|align=left| Bob Felstein
|KO
|2
|December 16, 1969
|align=left| Selland Arena, Fresno, California
|align=left|
|-
|Win
| 21–0
|align=left| Cleveland Williams
|KO
|3
|November 18, 1969
|align=left| Sam Houston Coliseum, Houston, Texas
|align=left|
|-
|Win
| 20–0
|align=left| Cleveland Williams
|TKO
|5
|September 13, 1969
|align=left| Selland Arena, Fresno, California
|align=left|
|-
|Win
| 19–0
|align=left| Roger Russell
|TKO
|3
|August 19, 1969
|align=left| Selland Arena, Fresno, California
|align=left|
|-
|Win
| 18–0
|align=left| Thad Spencer
|KO
|1
|May 20, 1969
|align=left| Selland Arena, Fresno, California
|align=left|
|-
|Win
|17–0
|align=left| Roger Rischer
|KO
|4
|January 21, 1969
|align=left| Selland Arena, Fresno, California
|align=left|
|-
|Win
| 16–0
|align=left| Joe Hemphill
|TKO
|3
|November 27, 1968
|align=left| Silver Slipper, Las Vegas, Nevada
|align=left|
|-
|Win
| 15–0
|align=left| Tommy Fields
|TKO
|5
|August 16, 1968
|align=left| Centennial Coliseum, Reno, Nevada
|align=left|
|-
|Win
| 14–0
|align=left| Tommy Burns
|KO
|1
|August 8, 1968
|align=left| Seattle Center Arena, Seattle, Washington
|align=left|
|-
|Win
| 13–0
|align=left| Curtis Bruce
|TKO
|3
|July 9, 1968
|align=left| Selland Arena, Fresno, California
|align=left|
|-
|Win
| 12–0
|align=left| Sonny Moore
|KO
|2
|April 2, 1968
|align=left| Selland Arena, Fresno, California
|align=left|
|-
|Win
| 11–0
|align=left| Steve Grant
|TKO
|2
|February 27, 1968
|align=left| Selland Arena, Fresno, California
|align=left|
|-
|Win
| 10–0
|align=left| Hubert Hilton
|TKO
|5
|January 23, 1968
|align=left| Selland Arena, Fresno, California
|align=left|
|-
|Win
| 9–0
|align=left| Roy Wallace
|KO
|7
|November 28, 1967
|align=left| Selland Arena, Fresno, California
|align=left|
|-
|Win
| 8–0
|align=left| Ray Junior Ellis
|KO
|2
|October 11, 1967
|align=left| Selland Arena, Fresno, California
|align=left|
|-
|Win
| 7–0
|align=left| Floyd Joyner
|TKO
|7
|August 29, 1967
|align=left| Selland Arena, Fresno, California
|align=left|
|-
|Win
| 6–0
|align=left| Lino Armenteros
|KO
|3
|June 13, 1967
|align=left| Selland Arena, Fresno, California
|align=left|
|-
|Win
| 5–0
|align=left| Lou Phillips
|KO
|3
|May 9, 1967
|align=left| Selland Arena, Fresno, California
|align=left|
|-
|Win
| 4–0
|align=left| L.J. Wheeler
|TKO
|6
|March 14, 1967
|align=left| Selland Arena, Fresno, California
|align=left|
|-
|Win
| 3–0
|align=left| Sam Wyatt
|KO
|1
|February 6, 1967
|align=left| Selland Arena, Fresno, California
|align=left|
|-
|Win
| 2–0
|align=left| Leroy Birmingham
|KO
|1
|January 5, 1967
|align=left| Olympic Auditorium, Los Angeles, California
|align=left|
|-
|Win
| 1–0
|align=left| Jimmy Gilmore
|KO
|3
|November 28, 1966
|align=left| Las Vegas, Nevada
|align=left|

References

External links
 
 

1942 births
2010 deaths
Boxers from California
Boxers from Virginia
Heavyweight boxers
Sportspeople from Fresno, California
United States Marines
Sportspeople from Alexandria, Virginia
American male boxers
African-American boxers
20th-century African-American sportspeople
21st-century African-American people